San Antonio is the seventh-most populous city in the United States and the second-most populous in the state of Texas.

San Antonio may also refer to:

Places

Argentina 
San Antonio, Arauco, a municipality and village in La Rioja Province
San Antonio de Areco, a city in Buenos Aires Province
Cape San Antonio, Argentina, a cape on the eastern coast of Buenos Aires Province
San Antonio de los Cobres, a town in Salta Province
San Antonio, Fray Mamerto Esquiú, a municipality in Catamarca Province
San Antonio (General Juan Facundo Quiroga), a municipality and village in La Rioja Province
San Antonio, Jujuy, a town and municipality in Jujuy Province
San Antonio, Misiones, a city in Misiones Province
San Antonio Oeste, a port city in Río Negro Province
San Antonio, Paclín, a village and municipality in Catamarca Province
San Antonio de La Paz, a village and municipality in Catamarca Province

Belize
San Antonio, a village in Corozal District
San Antonio, a village in Orange Walk District
San Antonio, Cayo, a village in the Cayo District
San Antonio, Toledo, a village in the Toledo District

Chile 
San Antonio, Chile, the capital of the San Antonio Province
San Antonio Province, one of eight provinces of the central Chilean region of Valparaíso

Colombia 
, a national monument in Santiago de Cali, Colombia
Cerro San Antonio, a town and municipality of the department of Magdalena
San Antonio, Tolima, a municipality in the department of Tolima 
San Antonio del Tequendama, a municipality and town of the department of Cundinamarca
 San Antonio, Buenaventura, village in Buenaventura Municipality, Valle del Cauca Department
San Antonio (Medellín), a station on the Medellín Metro, Medellín, Colombia
San Antonio, Tolima, a municipality in Colombia

Cuba 
San Antonio de los Baños, a municipality and town in Artemisa Province
San Antonio del Sur, a municipality and town in the Guantánamo Province
Cape San Antonio, Cuba, a cape which forms the western extremity of the Guanahacabibes Peninsula

Guatemala 
San Antonio Aguas Calientes, a municipality in the department of Sacatepéquez
San Antonio Huista, a municipality in the department of Huehuetenango
San Antonio Ilotenango, a municipality in the department of El Quiché
San Antonio La Paz, a municipality in the department of El Progreso
San Antonio Palopó, a municipality in the department of Sololá
San Antonio Sacatepéquez, a municipality in the department of San Marcos
San Antonio Suchitepéquez, a municipality in the department of Suchitepéquez
San Antonio Sija, a municipality in the department of Totonicapan

Honduras
San Antonio de Cortés, a municipality in the department of Cortés Department
San Antonio, Copán, a municipality in the department of Copán
San Antonio, Intibucá, a municipality in the department of Intibucá

Mexico

Oaxaca
San Antonio Acutla, a town and municipality in Oaxaca
San Antonio de la Cal, a town and municipality in Oaxaca 
San Antonio Huitepec, a town and municipality in Oaxaca 
San Antonio Nanahuatipam, a town and municipality in Oaxaca 
San Antonio Sinicahua, a town and municipality in Oaxaca 
San Antonio Tepetlapa, a town and municipality in Oaxaca

Other places in Mexico
San Antonio, Baja California Sur, a town in Baja California Sur
San Antonio la Isla, a town and municipality located in the State of Mexico
San Antonio, San Luis Potosí, a town and municipality in San Luis Potosí
San Antonio Tecómitl, a city in the Mexico City borough of Milpa Alta
Unión de San Antonio, Jalisco, a town and municipality in Jalisco

Peru 
San Antonio District, Cañete
San Antonio District, Huarochirí
San Antonio de Putina Province in the Puno region
San Antonio River (Peru)

Philippines 
San Antonio, Northern Samar, a municipality in Northern Samar
San Antonio, Nueva Ecija, a municipality in Nueva Ecija
San Antonio, Quezon, a municipality in Quezon
San Antonio, Zambales, a municipality in Zambales
San Antonio, Gandara, Samar, a barangay in Samar 
San Antonio, Parañaque, a barangay in Metro Manila
San Antonio, Quezon City, a barangay in Metro Manila
San Antonio, San Jose, Camarines Sur, a barangay in Camarines Sur
San Antonio, San Pedro, a barangay in Laguna
San Antonio, Santo Tomas, Batangas, a barangay in Batangas

Spain
Cape San Antonio, Spain, a cape on the north coast of Alicante province, Spain
San Antonio (Requena), a village in Valencia, Spain
Sant Antoni de Portmany, a town in Ibiza, Spain

United States

California 
Lake San Antonio in Monterey and San Luis Obispo Counties
Mount San Antonio of the San Gabriel Mountains, the highest point in Los Angeles County
San Antonio, California, an unincorporated community in Marin County
San Antonio, Oakland, California, a neighborhood in Alameda County
San Antonio Creek (Marin County, California), an eastward-flowing stream in Marin and Sonoma Counties
San Antonio Dam on the San Antonio River in Monterey County
San Antonio Dam (San Bernardino County) in San Bernardino County
San Antonio Reservoir (Alameda County)
San Antonio River (California) in Monterey County
San Antonio Shopping Center in Mountain View
San Antonio station (Caltrain), in Mountain View
San Antonio Valley, California in Santa Clara County
San Antonio Valley AVA, a wine region in Monterey County

Texas
San Antonio, a city in Texas
San Antonio (airport), an international airport in San Antonio, Texas
San Antonio (Amtrak station), a railroad station San Antonio, Texas
San Antonio River, Texas, originating in San Antonio
San Antonio Springs, a cluster of springs that provide a large portion of the water for the San Antonio River

Other places in the United States 
Barrio San Antonio, a neighborhood of Tucson, Arizona
San Antonio, Colorado, a community in Conejos County, Colorado
San Antonio, Florida, a city in Pasco County, Florida
San Antonio, Missouri, an unincorporated community in Buchanan County, Missouri
San Antonio, New Mexico, an unincorporated community in Socorro County, New Mexico
San Antonio Hot Springs, a system of thermal springs in Sandoval County, New Mexico

Uruguay 
San Antonio, Canelones, a village in the Canelones Department, Uruguay
San Antonio, Rocha, a seaside resort in the Rocha Department, Uruguay
San Antonio, Salto, a suburb of Salto in the Salto Department, Uruguay

Other places 
Laguna San Antonio, a lake in Bolivia
Santo Antônio do Sudoeste, a municipality in Paraná State, Brazil
San Antonio, San Miguel, a municipality in El Salvador
San Antonio de Palé (formerly "San Antonio de Praia"), the capital of Annobón, an island in Equatorial Guinea
San Antonio, Saipan, a settlement in the Mariana Islands
San Antonio, Panama, in Veraguas Province, Panama
San Antonio, Paraguay, a city in the Central Department, Paraguay
San Antonio (Asunción), a neighbourhood of Asunción, Paraguay
San Antonio (Higuillar), a subbarrio of Dorado, Puerto Rico
San Antonio (Poschiavo), a municipality in the canton of Grisons, Switzerland
San Antonio del Táchira, a city in the Venezuelan Andean state of Táchira, Venezuela
San Antonio District, a district in the canton of Atenas, Costa Rica

Entertainment
San Antone (album), 1984 album by Dan Seals
San Antone (film), 1953 American Western directed by Joseph Kane
"San Antonio," a song by Kinky from the 2002 album Kinky
San-Antonio, the protagonist in a series of French detective novels by Frédéric Dard
San Antonio (film), a 1945 western directed by David Butler

Transportation
San Antonio station (disambiguation), stations of the name
San Antonio, one of the ships of the Magellan Expedition
San Antonio, a trading ship converted into the warship galleon San Diego in 1600
USS San Antonio (LPD-17), an amphibious transport dock in the US Navy
San Antonio Class, similar amphibious transport docks in the US Navy
ST Sanantonio, a Greek tugboat

Other uses
San Antonio Handicap, a thoroughbred horse race in California, U.S.
San Antonio, Uvalde and Gulf Railroad, a former Texas railroad company

See also 
Rancho San Antonio (disambiguation)
Saint Anthony (disambiguation)
San Antonio Creek (disambiguation)
San Antonio River (disambiguation)
San Antonio Lake (disambiguation)
San Antonio District (disambiguation)
Sant'Antonio (disambiguation)
Santo Antônio (disambiguation)
San Antonino (disambiguation)